Federal Highway (abbreviation: FH2) is a Malaysian controlled-access highway connecting the capital city of Kuala Lumpur, and Klang, Selangor. The highway starts from Seputeh in Kuala Lumpur to Klang, Selangor. It is the busiest highway in Klang Valley during rush hour from/to Kuala Lumpur. The Federal Highway is coded as Federal Route 2.

History

The history of the highway started after the separation of Singapore from Malaysia on 9 August 1965, when the Malaysian government decided to make Port Swettenham (now Port Klang) as Malaysia's new national port as a replacement of Singapore. As a result, the government planned to build a highway connecting Port Klang to Kuala Lumpur by upgrading the former Kuala Lumpur–Klang Highway (Jalan Kuala Lumpur–Klang) (opened to traffic on 14 January 1959) to a full motorway by replacing the existing at-grade intersections with interchanges, making the Federal Highway as Malaysia's first expressway. The Kuala Lumpur–Petaling Jaya Traffic Dispersal Scheme was implemented in 1974 under the surviliance of the Malaysian Public Works Department (JKR). This scheme includes the Kuala Lumpur Inner Ring Road, Kuala Lumpur Middle Ring Road 1, Jalan Syed Putra and Federal Highway Route 2 (Kuala Lumpur–Petaling Jaya). Funded by a loan granted by the World Bank, the upgrade works for the Federal Highway from Subang Airport Interchange to Kuala Lumpur started from 1974 until 1977. The highway was originally a 4-lane limited access highway except for the Petaling Jaya stretch where it became 6-lane highway. However, in 1992 PLUS Expressways, the concession holder of North–South Expressway has upgraded the entire highway to a 6-lane highway with two toll plazas, Batu Tiga and Sungai Rasau. The 6-lane toll highway had begun in operation on 11 May 1993.
The highway handles incredible volumes of traffic there is significant congestion at more or less any time of day.

Upgrading of the Subang Airport Interchange and the Majlis Link
The upgrading of the Subang Airport Interchange including main link of Subang–Kelana Jaya Link from Sultan Abdul Aziz Shah Airport Highway (route 15) of Federal Highway (route 2) to Persiaran Kewajipan near Menara Mesiniaga began at the end of 2005 and the construction of the new Majlis Link in September 2005. Both project are led by Malaysian Public Works Department (JKR). While the main contractor are the Ahmad Zaki Resources Berhad (AZRB) and Ho Hup Construction Company Berhad (HHCC). The Majlis Link was completed in March 2007 while the Subang Airport Interchange was completed in September 2009.

Features

 Variable Message System (VMS) from Integrated Transport Information System (ITIS) Traffic Management Centre
 Three and four lane carriageway
 90 km/h speed limit
 LED Street Light
 Electronic LED billboards at street lights

Landmarks
The main landmarks of Federal Highway is Kota Darul Ehsan, the biggest arch in Malaysia located in Petaling Jaya. It was built on the orders of the former Sultan of Selangor, Sultan Salahuddin Abdul Aziz Shah to commemorate the cession of Kuala Lumpur to the federal government on 1 February 1974.
Another landmarks are Tugu Keris (Kris Monument) located near Sungai Rasau toll plaza in Klang but already relocated.

Other features
Federal Highway also has a motorcycle lane to avoid accidents between cars and motorcycles in that area.
Bulatan Selangor (also known as Shah Alam Cloverleaf Interchange) in Shah Alam, Selangor is the biggest cloverleaf interchange in Malaysia.
Breweries along this highway including Guinness Anchor Berhad (GAB) brewery in Sungai Way and Carlsberg brewery in Shah Alam.

Restricted routes for heavy vehicles
A restricted route has been implemented on the Federal Highway between Sungai Rasau and Subang during workdays and peak hours. Heavy vehicles (except buses and tankers) with laden and unladen heavy vehicles weighing 10,000 kg or more are not allowed to enter the expressway between 6:30 am until 9:30 am on Monday to Friday (except public holidays). A compound fine will be issued to heavy vehicles which flout the rule.

Criticisms

Motorcycle lane hazards
The Federal Highway is well known as the first expressway in Malaysia to have motorcycle lanes. However, the motorcycle lanes in the Federal Highway are known for posing danger to motorcyclists, due to dark, narrow and poorly maintained lanes and ramps, dangerous sharp corners, vulnerable spots for robberies. This has been attributed to the fact that the motorcycle lanes were originally intended for bicycle riders, with the design speed limit as low as 60 km/h.

On 29 August 2016, the Ministry of Works (MOW) allocated RM 3.13 million to upgrade motorcycle lanes on the Federal Highway in areas that fall under its care. The allocation would cover costs for brightening dark areas, installing pump houses at flood-prone areas, painting road lines and tunnel walls, lane-widening, building overhead ramps, additional signage and repair of intersections.

On 21 October 2016, during the announcement of the 2017 Budget, Prime Minister Najib Tun Razak announced that RM29 million would be allocated to upgrading the motorcycle lane on the Federal Highway. This included enhancing the drainage system to prevent flooding and building two overhead ramps, to make it safer for motorcyclists who use the route.

Traffic congestion area along the highway
There are several areas along the highway regarded as a congested area:-

Notable events
18 December 1988 - R. Arumugam, a Malaysian national football player, died in a car accident on the Federal Highway near the Mercedes Benz showroom at Petaling Jaya.
8 December 2010 - A driver was killed when he tried to make an illegal U-turn at KM 27.3 of the Federal Highway near Seri Setia.
21 April 2013 - Five people were killed following a freak accident along KM 10.1 of the Federal Highway near Shah Alam.
16 June 2013 - Three teenagers were killed and another injured when the car they were in crashed into the divider along KM 14.5 of the Federal Highway near Shah Alam.

Tolls

The tolls have been collected by a private concession company, PLUS Expressways, since 11 May 1993.
 Like other PLUS -operated highways, there is a 10% discount for class 1 vehicles between 12:00 midnight and 7:00 am (RM0.90 at SGR and RM1.00 at BTT) since 1 March 2009.
 From 1 January 2018, rates at Sungai Rasau Toll Plaza and Batu Tiga Toll Plaza will be abolished forever. Federal Highway users no longer have to pay tolls on these two tolls.

Electronic toll collection 
As part of an initiative to facilitate smoother passage at the Batu Tiga and Sungai Rasau Toll Plazas on Federal Highway. On 10 July 2014, the highway operator, PLUS Expressways, announced that all toll transactions at both toll plazas would be conducted electronically via PLUSMiles cards, Touch 'n Go cards or SmartTAGs starting 1 September 2014. Besides being more convenient to Federal Highway users and reducing jams at toll plazas caused by cash-paying motorists, this move may help reducing risks of robberies at toll plazas faced by toll attendants, as there will be less cash will be available. However, on 30 August 2014, the implementation of the ETCs at Batu Tiga and Sungai Rasau toll plaza was postponed by the federal government.

Since 22 November 2014, all toll transactions at Batu Tiga and Sungai Rasau toll plazas of the Federal Highway have been conducted electronically via PLUSMiles cards, Touch 'n Go cards or SmartTAGs.

Toll collection was discontinued on 1 January 2018.

Toll rates

Sungai Rasau toll plaza (SGR)

Batu Tiga toll plaza (BTT)

(* Toll payments between midnight and 7:00 am)

Note: Toll charges can only be paid with the Touch 'n Go and PLUSMiles cards or SmartTAG. Cash payment is not accepted.

List of interchanges

Below is a list of interchanges (exits), laybys and rest and service areas along the Federal Highway route. The exits are arranged in ascending numerical order from West to East.

See also
Persiaran Raja Muda Musa
Jalan Klang Lama
Jalan Syed Putra
Malaysia Federal Route 2
Malaysian expressway system
Malaysian Federal Roads system
Highway
Teras Teknologi

References

External links
 PLUS Expressway Berhad 
 Integrated Transport Information Systems
 Malaysian Public Works Department 
 Malaysian Highway Authority

Highways in Malaysia
Expressways and highways in the Klang Valley